Phuwanart Khamkaew (born January 17, 1998), is a Thai professional footballer who plays as a striker.

Club career
In youth career Phuwanart Khamkaew was trained for 2 years and a half at Leicester City in England.

References

External links

1998 births
Living people
Phuwanart Khamkaew
Association football forwards
Phuwanart Khamkaew
Phuwanart Khamkaew
Phuwanart Khamkaew
Phuwanart Khamkaew
Thai expatriate sportspeople in England
Phuwanart Khamkaew
Nakhon Si United F.C. players